Acacia fleckeri is an Australian tree of the genus Acacia and the subgenus Plurinerves that is endemic to northeastern Australia.

Description

Like most species of Acacia it has phyllodes rather than true leaves. The evergreen phyllodes have a narrowly elliptic to oblanceolate shape that is usually inequilateral and straight straight or incurved slightly. The phyllodes have three to six main nerves and anastomosing longitudinal minor nerves.

Taxonomy
The species was first formally described by the botanist Leslie Pedley in 1978 as part of the work A revision of Acacia Mill. in Queensland as published in the journal Austrobaileya. It was classified by Pedley on 1987 as Racosperma fleckeri and returned to genus Acacia in 2001.

Distribution
It is found on the Cape York Peninsula of Queensland from around Weipa in the west to around Bowden and the Pascoe and Wenlock Rivers in the east. It is often situated on shell mounds or along sandy river or creek banks as a part of fringing woodland communities along with species of Eucalyptus, Melaleuca, Leptospermum and other species of Acacia.

See also
 List of Acacia species

References

fleckeri
Flora of Queensland
Taxa named by Leslie Pedley
Plants described in 1978